"The Western Book of the Dead" is the first episode of the second season of the American anthology crime drama television series True Detective. It is the 9th overall episode of the series and was written by series creator Nic Pizzolatto, and directed by Justin Lin. It was first broadcast on HBO in the United States on June 21, 2015.

The season is set in California, and focuses on three detectives, Ray Velcoro (Colin Farrell), Ani Bezzerides (Rachel McAdams) and Paul Woodrugh (Taylor Kitsch), from three cooperating police departments and a criminal-turned-businessman named Frank Semyon (Vince Vaughn) as they investigate a series of crimes they believe are linked to the murder of a corrupt politician.

According to Nielsen Media Research, the episode was seen by an estimated 3.17 million household viewers and gained a 1.4 ratings share among adults aged 18–49. The episode received mixed-to-positive reviews from critics, who praised the cast, cinematography, and Lin's directing. However, some expressed criticism for the writing, with many criticizing the "over-stuffed" characters and pacing.

Plot
In the fictional industrial town of Vinci, California, Vinci Police Detective Ray Velcoro (Colin Farrell) drops off his son Chad (Trevor Larcom) at school. Later, he is interviewed by an attorney regarding his ex-wife, who was raped years ago and there is uncertainty regarding whether Velcoro is Chad's father, and Velcoro refuses to get a paternity test, claiming that Chad is his son. He also states that the man who raped her was never found. In reality, years ago, he contacted corrupt businessman Frank Semyon (Vince Vaughn), who gave him the information to find the man and is now in his payroll.

As Vinci plans for a real estate development near a new high-speed rail line, Semyon is working on the deal in order to present it to Russian criminal businessman, Osip Agronov (Timothy V. Murphy). Semyon's partner and city manager, Ben Caspere, is set to present the plans and leaves his house. During this time, the local newspaper starts reporting possible corruption cases in the city. Meanwhile, Ventura County Detective Ani Bezzerides (Rachel McAdams) and her team conduct a raid on a suspected illegal brothel, but turns out to be a legal porn studio. She also discovers her sister Athena (Leven Rambin), who works as a cam girl. She reprimands Athena but she rebuffs her claims. Later, Bezzerides is asked by a woman to find her missing sister, Vera. She and her partner Elvis Ilinca (Michael Irby) visit a meditation center run by Bezzerdides' father, Eliot (David Morse), who states that Vera used to work there.

On the day of the presentation, Caspere goes missing and Velcoro is instructed to investigate his whereabouts. Velcoro and Detective Teague Dixon (W. Earl Brown) check Caspere's house, with evidence pointing to a kidnapping. In another part of the city, California Highway Patrol officer Paul Woodrugh (Taylor Kitsch) stops a car for high speed. The driver, actress Lacey Lindel (Ashley Hinshaw), tries to seduce him in order to avoid a ticket. She later files a complaint against him, claiming sexual misconduct and Woodrugh is put on paid leave while the case is investigated. He goes home with his girlfriend Emily (Adria Arjona), and they have sex, although Woodrugh secretly went to the bathroom to use Viagra.

As Osip arrives in Vinci, Semyon is forced to make the presentation without Caspere in front of his associates and wife Jordan (Kelly Reilly). Despite his interest, Osip wants to wait on the deal until Caspere returns as he is not fully confident on Semyon, angering him. Semyon also orders Velcoro to intimidate Dan Howser (Stevin Knight), the writer of the newspaper's articles, to stop writing about the city's corruption and retrieve any incriminating evidence against them. 

Later, Velcoro visits his son at school and immediately recognizes that his shoes were damaged and forces Chad to reveal what happened. Chad states that a bully kid named Aspen Conroy broke into his locker and damaged his shoes. He uses his police contacts in order to get the kid's address. That night, Velcoro visits the address and brutally attacks Aspen's father in front him, warning him that he will kill his parents if he ever bullies Chad or any other kid ever again. He then meets with Semyon to give him the evidence, who is revealed to have sent the attorney to help him gain custody of Chad.

In bed at night, Woodrugh is questioned by Emily about his scars, revealing that the scars are before his Army services but does not reveal what caused them. He leaves the house and goes driving in his motorcycle with no helmet. He then turns off the motorcycle's headlights and exceeds the speed limit. Eventually, he turns them back on and ends up in the side of the road. He notices a man in a bench and approaches him, finding that his eyes were burned out; his ID reveals that the man is Caspere himself. He reports the location and authorities arrive, including Velcoro and Bezzerides.

Production

Development
In January 2014, Nic Pizzolatto signed a two-year contract extension with HBO, effectively renewing the series for two additional seasons. Much like its predecessor, the season consists of eight episodes, all written by Pizzolatto. In September 2014, Justin Lin joined the series to direct the first two episodes of the season. 

In June 2015, the episode's title was revealed as "The Western Book of the Dead" and it was announced that series creator Nic Pizzolatto had written the episode while Justin Lin had directed it. This was Pizzolatto's ninth writing credit, and Lin's first directing credit. The title is based on a book of the same name by Alfred Schmielewski, who went by the name Yogi A.S. Narayana.

Casting
In September 2014, Colin Farrell announced that he would join the series, while doing an interview with the Sunday World. By the end of the month, Vince Vaughn joined the series. In November 2014, Rachel McAdams, Taylor Kitsch, and Kelly Reilly were announced as the remaining main cast members.

Reception

Viewers
The episode was watched by 3.17 million viewers, earning a 1.4 in the 18-49 rating demographics on the Nielson ratings scale. This means that 1.4 percent of all households with televisions watched the episode. This was a 10% decrease from the previous episode, which was watched by 3.52 million viewers with a 1.6 in the 18-49 demographics. But it was a 36% increase from the previous season premiere, which was watched by 2.33 million viewers with a 1.0 in the 18-49 demographics.

Critical reviews
"The Western Book of the Dead" received mixed-to-positive reviews from critics. The review aggregator website Rotten Tomatoes reported a 74% approval rating for the episode, based on 23 reviews, with an average rating of 6.7/10. The site's consensus states: "Strong performances by the season two True Detective cast make for a compelling hour of television, even when the story takes a little too long to get going."

Roth Cornet of IGN gave the episode a "good" 7.5 out of 10 and wrote in her verdict, "By its very nature True Detective Season 2 is poised to be compared with its predecessor. It also cannot become the unexpected hit of the season... because we are expecting it. We're looking for it. Some would defy it to be as riveting as those first few episodes of Season 1. This is not the mesmerizing tale of two diametrically opposed men who become bound by blood and the search for honor, though. The debut episode of True Detectives second season is burdened by an overly complex plot and weakened by simplified character sketches. However, in total this is an engaging enough detective series that has the potential to become more so."

Erik Adams of The A.V. Club gave the episode a "B-" grade and wrote, "'The Western Book Of The Dead' excels at setting up a mystery but lacks for satisfying drama, if only because these characters aren't so interesting on their own." Britt Hayes of Screen Crush wrote, "'The Western Book of the Dead' isn't an incredibly strong episode, but it is a rather solid introduction to the dark and grimy world of Season 2 — and it firmly establishes itself as independent from its predecessor in the process. To its credit, the premiere (and especially the last few moments) leave me wanting to know and see more."

Alan Sepinwall of HitFix wrote, "This episode on a whole felt a lot more like a lot of other crime shows, albeit with a great cast and Pizzolatto's brand of dialogue." Gwilym Mumford of The Guardian wrote, "For so much of this episode, the connective tissue between this quartet remains hidden, as if writer Nic Pizzolatto is happy just to wallow in the murk and misery of their circumstances." Ben Travers of IndieWire gave the episode a "B-" grade and wrote, "'The Western Book of the Dead' is far from a perfect episode of television, but it also shouldn't scare off any viewers who didn't expect lightning to strike twice."

Jeff Jensen of Entertainment Weekly wrote, "We have a three-headed narrative, pocked with vice and steeped in themes of sin, penance, and flailing redemption. This year's collection of characters and the storytelling don't capture my imagination the way Rust Cohle, Marty Hart, and the time-toggling, unreliable narrator yarn-spinning did last year. So we hope-watch, to borrow from Alan Sepinwall. May the season catch fire, or I'll be as sad as Colin Farrell's droopstache." Aaron Riccio of Slant Magazine wrote, "As the camera zooms out at the close of 'The Western Book of the Dead', the three officers stand triangularly around the body and look at one another. It feels like an opportunity not just to be seen, but to change the way they're seen. It is, pretentious as it may seem, a chance to live anew." 

Kenny Herzog of Vulture gave the episode a 3 star rating out of 5 and wrote, "This True Detective introduces us to ostensible protagonists even further removed from their humanity than Rust Cohle or Marty Hart, with that much more work to do if there's a chance at redemption. It's a lot like casework." Tony Sokol of Den of Geek gave the episode a 4 star rating out of 5 and wrote, "True Detective is art. Sure, this season is going to be a police procedural devoid of the mystical mayhem that made the debut an instant classic. But we are going to see procedures we don’t get on other shows. It's just deeper. It's a novel onscreen. You can almost hear the click of a keyboard as the camera fades take the place of commas and periods." 

Carissa Pavlica of TV Fanatic gave the episode a 4.3 star rating out of 5 and wrote, "We couldn't ask for a better cast of actors to embody the characters introduced in 'The Western Book of the Dead'. They are some of the very best of our generation. Whether they'll find the same simpatico rhythm that Rust Cohle and Marty Hart found by the end of Season 1 remains to be seen, but all of the elements are certainly within this group for magic to happen." Shane Ryan of Paste gave the episode a 7.8 out of 10 and wrote, "Of course, the rawness of tone persists, and it makes 'The Western Book of the Dead' a compelling hour of television. I just hope that as we dig into this world, we move past the stylistic bag of tricks so expertly provided by director Justin Lin. At some point, we need to hit a foundation."

References

External links
 "The Western Book of the Dead" at HBO
 

2015 American television episodes
True Detective episodes
Television episodes written by Nic Pizzolatto